The Lower Toklat Ranger Cabin No. 18, also known as the Lower Toklat Patrol Cabin, is a log shelter in the National Park Service Rustic style in Denali National Park.  The cabin is part of a network of shelters used by patrolling park rangers throughout the park.  It is a standard design by the National Park Service Branch of Plans and Designs and was built in  1931. The cabin has twelve separate log dog kennels, also to a standard Park Service design.

Work began in the summer of 1931, with construction carried out by contracted carpenters, described as "two old Swedes". A ranger-built food cache and dog houses followed in 1933 and 1936.The design originated at Yellowstone National Park, adapted in this case with a somewhat larger size.

References

Buildings and structures in Denali Borough, Alaska
Ranger stations in Denali National Park and Preserve
Park buildings and structures on the National Register of Historic Places in Alaska
Log cabins in the United States
Rustic architecture in Alaska
National Register of Historic Places in Denali National Park and Preserve
Log buildings and structures on the National Register of Historic Places in Alaska
1931 establishments in Alaska
Buildings and structures on the National Register of Historic Places in Denali Borough, Alaska